West Vancouver Field Hockey Club is a field hockey club based in West Vancouver, British Columbia, Canada, it was established in 1972. With over 2500 members from both North Vancouver (city and district municipality) and West Vancouver, it is the largest field hockey club in North America and home to some of Canada's top players. It is often abbreviated to WVFHC.

The club consists of four independent divisions: Junior Girls and Boys, Women's, Men's and the Adanacs player development program.  The Women's teams play in the Vancouver Women's Field Hockey Association, while the Men's teams play in the Vancouver Men's Field Hockey League. Both leagues include teams from throughout the Lower Mainland of British Columbia and Vancouver Island.

Since its inception in 2004, over 85 graduates of the Adanacs player development program have gone on to play on U Sports and NCAA teams. Players from WVFHC have gone on to attend prestigious universities in the United States like Princeton, Harvard, Stanford, Boston College and many more.

Several club members have gone on to play on the Canada women's national field hockey team and Canada men's national field hockey team.

Notable Members

 Jessica Barnett, National Team player 
 Ian Bird, Olympian, National Team player
 Johanna Bischof, National Team player 
 Rachael Donohoe, National Team player 
 Hannah Haughn, National Team player 
 Karli Johanson, National Team player 
 Ashley Kristen, National Team player 
 Tiffany Michaluk, National Team player 
 Peter Milkovich, coach, Olympian, National Team player
 Stephanie Norlander, National Team player 
 Mark Pearson, coach, Olympian, National Team player
 Ross Rutledge, coach, founder of the Adanacs program, Olympian, National Team
 Holly Stewart, National Team player 
 Scott Tupper, coach, Men's Premier team player, Olympian, current National Team captain  
 Paul Wettlaufer, Olympian, National Team
 Amanda Bird, Princeton University, player, scored the winning goal in overtime to win the NCAA Tournament in 2012

External links
 West Vancouver Field Hockey Club
 Field Hockey BC
 Field Hockey Canada
 Vancouver Women's Field Hockey Association
 Vancouver Men's Field Hockey League

West Vancouver
1972 establishments in British Columbia
Canadian field hockey clubs
Field hockey clubs established in 1972